Aselsan EIRS (Early Warning RADAR System) is a new generation S-Band radar, developed for long range early warning purposes, with AESA and digital beamforming antenna architecture. The system developed by Turkish company Aselsan. In addition to air-breathing air targets, EIRS also has the ability to detect and track Ballistic Missiles and targets with stealth technology / low RKA from long range.

Thanks to its EIRS, AESA and digital beamforming architecture and its multi-channel receiver structure, it has the ability to create more than one beam at the same time. EIRS has the feature of using meteorological data in order to increase its detection and tracking performance.

The radar, communication / command control and power subsystems that make up the EIRS are carried on tactical vehicles. For this reason, EİRS, which has high mobility, does not require any disassembly and assembly for installation and assembly. By connecting to existing radar networks, EİRS can share messages in AWCIES format, 3D aerial image with other systems and Control Notification Centers via radio or radio links.

EIRS has the ability to fuse data with other EIRSs and transfer trace information to transfer targets, which are critical for ballistic missile defense. The long range Mode 5 IFF interrogator is integrated with a high gain IFF antenna to support the operational modes of the radar. EIRS's AESA architecture and modular design approach support the concepts of low cost maintenance and high availability.

EIRS has electronic protection features such as wide frequency band frequency and time mobility, side beam dimming, and low side beam levels.

Systems to be Procured

 Portable Early Warning Radar System (TEIRS): 4
 Fixed Early Warning Radar System (SEIRS): 18 units

Some of these radars will replace older radars.

Others will be deployed in areas with low altitude vulnerability due to rugged geography, depending on the need for radar coverage.

In this context, ASELSAN; It works on two different long-range air surveillance and early warning radars with a rotating and fixed (9o sector angle) antenna using Active Phased Array Antenna technology.

General Features  

Weather elements it can detect:

 Air-to-air missiles
 Air-ground missiles
 Low altitude cruise missiles
 Anti radiation missiles
 Low face and low cross section UAVs
 Helicopters
 Airplanes
 Tactical, short, medium range ballistic missiles
 Other
 Maximum detection range: 
 Number of targets that can be tracked at the same time: 200-300
 Broadcast frequency: S Band
 Antenna: Active phased array
 3-dimensional target search, detection and tracking (coordinates and altitude)
 Automatic target classification
 IFF (Friend / foe identification) inquiry
 Separate beams for searching and tracking
 Integration to control reporting centers
 Electronic warfare resistance
 Compliance with air and missile defense systems
 Reducing the reaction time by directly transferring target information to weapon systems
 Ability to work in all weather conditions and day / night
 Ability to eliminate false target echoes that wind power plants can create

TEIRS Features

The system consists of the following subsystems that can be transported on 10-ton class vehicles:

 Radar subsystem tool
 Command control vehicle
 Radio link subsystem tool
 Generator tool
 Local control from the command control vehicle or remotely from the command control center
 Transportable with C130 or A400M
 Setup and assembly time in 30 minutes

Commissioning Date. 

 .

References 

Military radars
Ground radars
Post–Cold War military equipment of Turkey
Early warning systems
Aselsan products